Rubén Sánchez also known as Zoonchez is a Spanish artist known for creating colorful compositions in his works, mostly with elements in balance. He has made sculptures and large-scale public murals works in Canada, UAE, France, Jordan, Germany, Turkey, Hungary, Sweden and the United States.

Early life
Sánchez was born in Madrid in 1979. He developed an interest in graffiti at the age of 13. He later quit school and started working day jobs. Feeling tired of these jobs, he took interest in learning graphic design. In the 2000s, he moved to Barcelona and worked in different graphic design agencies. During this time period, he started creating his first artworks on reclaimed materials and created his first signature characters in the streets.

Career
Sánchez began his artistic career at street level, where he mostly painted graffiti. Later he began drawing illustrations and mixed illustration with his original graffiti skills. He made several of these artworks in streets and public places as well as on different mediums such canvases, wood and all type of recycled materials.

In 2012, Sánchez began his one-year art residency program at Tashkeel in Dubai established by Lateefa bint Maktoum. During this time, he created a vast amount of artworks and painted the first public outdoor mural in the country (non-commercial). This residency helped him become a full-time artist.

In 2019, he designed the brand identity of the UEFA Champions League Finals in Madrid.

Sánchez has also conducted several humanitarian projects throughout his career. Between 2014 and 2016, he created several murals in refugee camps in Zaatari (Jordan) and Lesbos (Greece). In collaboration with AptART, he conducted different projects to highlight the views of children from Syria and Jordan regarding their homes, after a civil war in Syria made people leave their homes and reside in refugee camps. Later on, he created in Russeifa (Jordan) a mural, Pushing Boundaries to highlight women rights and other gender issues.

Style and influences

Sánchez's work is characterized by vibrant color palettes, asymmetry and lack of perfect proportions. He tends to convey certain messages and concerns through his art where the viewer is challenged to depict. In a major mural project, Sanchez used tribal art in surrealism style rendered in Mediterranean colors and presented "a woman oppressed by the walls of her house trying to take down the walls and metaphorically opening herself to the world."

Sánchez's canvases, murals, ceramics, and large public sculptures depict a strong Mediterranean influence. He cites "Joan Miró, Le Corbusier or Henri Matisse or Pablo Picasso, or Juan Gris" as his main influences. His recent artworks exhibit a variety of themes, including connectivity, human imperfection, balances and imbalances.

Selected exhibitions
2022 – Urban Break, Volery Gallery, Seoul
2022 – LA Art Fair, Moberg Booth, Los Angeles
2022 – Embodiment, Heron Arts, San Francisco
2022 – Contemporary Abstraction, Moberg Gallery, Des Moines, Iowa 
2022 – Panorama, Cohle Gallery, Menorca 
2021 – Emoción, Galería Ola, Barcelona
2020 – Recién Pintado, Centro Cultural El Carm, Badalona
2020 – Beyond the Walls, Cohle Gallery, Paris
2020 – SWAY, Moberg Gallery, Des Moines, Iowa
2019 – In Bloom, Moberg Gallery, Des Moines, Iowa
2019 – New Start, Happy Gallery, Paris
2018 – 10 Years Later, Tashkeel, Dubai
2017 – Refuge in Paint, NAMLA, Miami
2016 – Connectivity, Tashkeel, Dubai 
2016 – The Lucid Dream, Installation, Dubai Design District, Dubai
2015 – Contemporary Istanbul, Istanbul
2015 – Fisticuffs, Dubai
2015 – It's Summertime!, London 
2014 – Colors of Resilience, Amman 
2014 – Art Dubai, Dubai 
2014, 2015 – Made in Tashkeel, Dubai (UAE)
2013 – Sikka Art Fair, Dubai
2013 – The B Side, Solo Show, Tashkeel Gallery, Dubai
2012 – Reskate Exhibition, Bright Tradeshow, Berlin
2012–2013 – Gráfika, 30 Artists from a young Spain. World Tour 
2012 – Vias Subversivas, Mallorca
2011 – Proyecto Haiti, Barcelona
2009 – Painting Alive, Apetit Gallery. Bilbao
2009 – Simbiosis, Espacio Espora, Madrid 
2008 – Wood Pushers, Hecklewood Gallery, Portland
2006 – Hey Ho Let's Go, Barcelona

References 

Living people
Spanish artists
Graffiti artists
Street artists
Contemporary artists
1979 births